Laryea is a given name. Notable people with the given name include:

Laryea Adjetey (born 1973), Ghanaian footballer
Laryea Kingston (born 1980), Ghanaian footballer

See also
Laryea, surname